Ngapoi Cedain Zhoigar (pinyin: Āpèi Cáidàn Zhuógá; September 1915 - 24 May 2012) was a member of the Tibetan aristocratic Ngapoi clan. Since the founding of the PRC, she served as the Vice President of the  Tibetan Women's Federation. She was married to Ngapoi Ngawang Jigme. The couple has 12 children.

Tibetan politicians
Political office-holders in Tibet
Chinese Communist Party politicians from Tibet
People from Lhasa
People's Republic of China politicians from Tibet
Burials at Babaoshan Revolutionary Cemetery
Tibetan women
All-China Women's Federation people
1915 births
2012 deaths